Stonebridge International Insurance Ltd.,  (Stonebridge) has been a general insurer for over 10 years. Its European head office is in Maidenhead, in the United Kingdom. The company was licensed to passport its services in the following countries: Denmark, Finland, France, Germany, Ireland, Italy, Norway, Poland, Portugal, Spain, Sweden and the United Kingdom.

History 
Stonebridge International Insurance was founded in 1998, and is part of AEGON Direct Marketing Services International and a member of the Aegon group of companies.

Aegon's history dates back to the mid-1800s.  In 1983 AGO and Ennia merged and formed AEGON. In addition to the acquisitions of Scottish Equitable in the UK in 1983, Providian in the USA in the 1997,
Guardian Royal Exchange Assurance in the UK in 1999, Transamerica in the USA in 1999, Stonebridge International Insurance Ltd was formed to provide a range of accident and health products.

The Aegon group provides life insurance, pensions and investments products and has some 40 million customers in over twenty markets in the Americas, Europe and Asia.  The group has around 27,500 employees worldwide with total assets exceeding €332 billion as at 2010.

On 7 August 2014 the company was fined £8.3 million by UK regulators over tactics employed by companies which Stonebridge had outsourced the sale of many of their insurance policies to. These companies sold policies to some hundreds of thousands of people in the UK and Europe using telesales scripts that Stonebridge had provided, which the regulator said did not provide clear, fair and balanced information.

In 2018, Stonebridge was voted as one of the worst insurance companies for receiving complaints, using numbers gathered by the Financial Ombudsman Service, receiving 40 general insurance complaints.

In October 2020, Aegon sold Stonebridge to Global Premium Holdings for £60 million.  Stonebridge had been closed for new business since 2014 and had around 200,000 customers in the U.K., Germany, France, Spain, Italy, the Nordics and Ireland.

Operations 
Stonebridge International Insurance Ltd. provides accident, health, and unemployment cover for individuals, which it promotes direct and through business partners across Europe within the financial, retail and utility sectors.

References

External links 

 
 Shared Customer Objectives
 FSA Register

Insurance companies of the United Kingdom
Financial services companies established in 1998